The 2009 Grand Prix Hassan II was a tennis tournament played on outdoor clay courts. It was the 25th edition of the Grand Prix Hassan II, and was an ATP Tour World 250 event on the 2009 ATP World Tour. It took place at the Complexe Al Amal in Casablanca, Morocco, from April 6 through April 12, 2009.

Finals

Singles

 Juan Carlos Ferrero defeated  Florent Serra, 6–4, 7–5
It was Juan Carlos Ferrero's 1st title in 5 years, and his 12th overall.

Doubles

 Łukasz Kubot /  Oliver Marach defeated  Simon Aspelin /  Paul Hanley, 7–6(7–4), 3–6, [10–6]

External links
 Official website

 
Grand Prix Hassan II
Grand Prix Hassan II